Daiana Alves Menezes (born June 20, 1987) is a Brazilian actress, singer, and television host based in the Philippines and working for GMA Network. Menezes is best known as one of the hosts of Eat Bulaga!.

Career 
Menezes worked with her father in their growing shoe business, leading her to take a Fashion Design business course. She later graduated from the New York Film Academy. Offers from several countries, including Thailand, were followed by one in the Philippines. She appeared in various commercials internationally before becoming a TV personality in the Philippines on TV5, ABS-CBN, and GMA Network. She was featured in Maxim Philippines' June 2009 issue and in FHM Philippines' October 2011, 2014, and 2017 issue. 
She endorses Baliwag Lechon, Master Siomai, Flauntit, Rebisco Hansel crackers, Texas Wild chips, Choco Mucho, Judge (chewing gum), Sassa Activewear, Belo, Pretty Looks, Lady Grace and Ever Bilena, Mike Cervera Hair, Shell, and Scratch It!.

Menezes was awarded 2022 best host on the best choice awards and best television host and singer of 2022 on Pinnacle Awards, 2020 NCCA for "performing arts singing", and previously the prestigious 2012, 2014, and 2015 Global Achiever Awardee as Outstanding Ramp Model and Commercial Endorser by the Asia Pacific Awards Council (APAC) during the 20th Annual Asia Pacific Excellence Awards, headed by chairman Jonathan Navea and Japanese educator Dr. Seiji Yii-Kagawa.

Menezes also got the highest, record-breaking bid for a second-hand bikini to help raise funds for a beach environment in the Philippines. The bidder paid 100,000.00 pesos for her used bikini on November 28, 2012.

Menezes is the main host of two taped (not live) TV shows on Pinoy Xtreme, Super Sabong (since 2015) and #chikatitas. She is now concentrating on her music with the 8ONE group.

Personal life 
As a college student, Menezes was an international model, pianist, and painter. She went to Centro Universitário UNA, taking Fashion Design in Belo Horizonte New York FILM ACADEMY graduate New York City. Her father runs a shoe business in Brazil and created the franchise named after what Daiana chose as a store name. A small town, Bairro Menezes in Cataguases, Minas Gerais, was named after her grandfather, Romualdo Menezes.

In 2013, Menezes joined PETA's campaign to free Mali from Manila Zoo and have her transferred to Boon Lott's Elephant Sanctuary where she will have access to proper veterinary care, space to roam, and to be in the company of other elephants. Mali has been in captivity in Manila for more than 3 decades after she was poached from the wild.

Menezes was married to Jose Benjamin Benaldo, who attempted suicide after he lost in the 2013 elections.

Filmography

Television

Film

Online

References

Hear Ye! Hear Ye! Daiana Meneses is on FHM's Cover!

Spotify
SOCIAL MEDIA
Instagram
Facebook

Brazilian expatriates in the Philippines
Brazilian television personalities
Brazilian female models
People from Belo Horizonte
1987 births
Living people